The 2019 Gibraltar Darts Trophy is the thirteenth of thirteen PDC European Tour events on the 2019 PDC Pro Tour. The tournament is taking place at the Victoria Stadium, Gibraltar, from 27–29 September 2019. It features a field of 48 players and £140,000 in prize money, with £25,000 going to the winner.

Michael van Gerwen was the defending champion after defeating Adrian Lewis 8–3 in the previous year's final, but he lost in the third round 6–3 to Nathan Aspinall.

Dave Chisnall hit his first European Tour nine-dart finish in his quarter-final against James Wade, which was the fifth European Tour nine-darter of 2019, equalling the record set in the inaugural year in 2012.

Krzysztof Ratajski won his sixth PDC title, and his first on the European Tour, with an 8–2 win against Chisnall in the final.

Prize money
This is how the prize money is divided:

 Seeded players who lose in the second round do not receive this prize money on any Orders of Merit.

Qualification and format
The top 16 entrants from the PDC ProTour Order of Merit on 10 September will automatically qualify for the event and will be seeded in the second round.

The remaining 32 places will go to players from six qualifying events – 18 from the UK Tour Card Holder Qualifier (held on 20 September), six from the European Tour Card Holder Qualifier (held on 20 September), two from the West & South European Associate Member Qualifier (held on 12 September), four from the Host Nation Qualifier (held on 26 September), one from the Nordic & Baltic Qualifier (held on 24 August), and one from the East European Qualifier (held on 25 August).

From 2019, the Host Nation, Nordic & Baltic and East European Qualifiers will only be available to non-Tour Card holders. Any Tour Card holders from the applicable regions will have to play the main European Qualifier.

The following players will take part in the tournament:

Top 16
  Michael van Gerwen (third round)
  Ian White (quarter-finals)
  Gerwyn Price (quarter-finals)
  Dave Chisnall (runner-up)
  James Wade (quarter-finals)
  Daryl Gurney (semi-finals)
  Krzysztof Ratajski (champion)
  Peter Wright (quarter-finals)
  Mensur Suljović (third round)
  Joe Cullen (third round)
  Glen Durrant (third round)
  Jonny Clayton (second round)
  Jermaine Wattimena (third round)
  Rob Cross (third round)
  Michael Smith (third round)
  Nathan Aspinall (semi-finals)

UK Qualifier
  Jamie Hughes (first round)
  Ritchie Edhouse (second round)
  Steve Beaton (second round)
  Chris Dobey (second round)
  Carl Wilkinson (second round)
  Keegan Brown (first round)
  Matt Clark (first round)
  Paul Rowley (second round)
  Tony Newell (first round)
  William O'Connor (first round)
  Justin Pipe (first round)
  Darren Webster (first round)
  Ryan Joyce (second round)
  Scott Taylor (first round)
  Ryan Meikle (first round)
  Robert Thornton (first round)
  Kirk Shepherd (first round)
  Steve West (first round)

European Qualifier
  Jeffrey de Zwaan (second round)
  Danny Noppert (second round)
  Kim Huybrechts (third round)
  Darius Labanauskas (first round)
  Dimitri Van den Bergh (second round)
  José de Sousa (second round)

West/South European Qualifier
  Michael Rosenauer (second round)
  Wessel Nijman (second round)

Host Nation Qualifier
  David Francis (second round)
  Antony Lopez (first round)
  Dyson Parody (second round)
  Justin Hewitt (first round)

Nordic & Baltic Qualifier
  Cor Dekker (first round)

East European Qualifier
  Krzysztof Kciuk (second round)

Draw

References

2019 PDC Pro Tour
2019 PDC European Tour
2019 in Gibraltarian sport
September 2019 sports events in Europe